The Leib Carriage House is a historic building located at 60 N. Keeble Ave. in San Jose, California, in The Alameda district. The carriage house, owned by Judge Samuel Franklin Leib, was built in the 1870s as the Garden Alameda area was being developed. The estate and original home are gone, but the carriage house is listed on the National Register of Historic Places.  Fuller Law Firm is the current owner of the property.

Samuel Franklin Leib was a successful San Jose attorney whose clients included Mrs. Sarah Winchester and Mrs. Jane Stanford.

References 

National Register of Historic Places in Santa Clara County, California
Buildings and structures in San Jose, California